Efthymios Tsakaleris (alternate spellings: Efthimios, Efthymis, Efthimis) (Greek: Ευθύμης Τσακαλέρης; born July 22, 1989) is a Greek professional basketball player. He is a 2.07 m (6 ft 9  in) tall power forward-center.

Professional career
Tsakaleris began his professional career with Panellinios in the Greek Basket League in 2009. He moved to PAOK in 2011. In 2012, he joined Aris.

In 2014, Tsakaleris joined Panelefsiniakos. In 2015, he joined Rethymno Cretan Kings, after playing two games with Bashkimi in the Kosovo Basketball Superleague. On 24 September 2016, Tsakaleris joined Arkadikos.

Greek national team
With Greece's junior national team, Tsakaleris won the gold medal at the 2009 FIBA Europe Under-20 Championship.

References

External links
EuroCup Profile
FIBA Europe Profile
Greek Basket League Profile
Eurobasket.com Profile
Draftexpress.com Profile

1989 births
Living people
Aris B.C. players
Arkadikos B.C. players
Bashkimi Prizren players
Centers (basketball)
Greek men's basketball players
Greek Basket League players
Panelefsiniakos B.C. players
Panellinios B.C. players
P.A.O.K. BC players
Power forwards (basketball)
Rethymno B.C. players
Basketball players from Thessaloniki